Saskia Kosterink (born August 13, 1984 in Zwolle) is a Dutch softball player, who represents the Dutch national team in international competitions.

Kosterink played for Run '71 Oldenzaal, Tex Town Tigers, Gulf Coast CC and since 2007 for Sparks Haarlem. She is an outfielder who bats and throws right-handed. She competes for the Dutch national team since 2005. In 2007 she hit the most home runs in the Dutch Softball Hoofdklasse and during the European Championships that year she was named as Best Outfielder of the tournament. She was part of the Dutch team for the 2008 Summer Olympics in Beijing.

External links
 Kosterink at dutchsoftballteam.com

References

1984 births
Living people
Dutch softball players
Olympic softball players of the Netherlands
Softball players at the 2008 Summer Olympics
Sportspeople from Zwolle